
The following is a list of Playboy Playmates of 1955. Playboy magazine names its Playmate of the Month each month throughout the year.

January

Bettie Page (April 22, 1923 – December 11, 2008) was an American model who became famous in the 1950s for her fetish modeling and pin-up photos. She has often been called the "Queen of pinups". Her look, including her jet black hair and trademark bangs, has influenced many artists. She was also one of the earliest Playmates of the Month for Playboy magazine.

February

Jayne Mansfield (April 19, 1933 – June 29, 1967) was an American actress working both on Broadway and in Hollywood. One of the leading blonde sex symbols of the 1950s, Mansfield starred in several popular Hollywood films that emphasized her platinum-blonde hair, hourglass figure and cleavage-revealing costumes. Mansfield had been a Playboy Playmate of the Month and appeared in the magazine several additional times. She died in an automobile accident at age 34.

March
No issue was published for March 1955.

April

Marilyn Ardith Waltz (November 5, 1931 – December 23, 2006) was an American actress and model. She was Playboys Playmate of the Month in the February 1954, April 1954, and April 1955 issues.

She was the first of two women to become a three-time Playmate (the other being Janet Pilgrim). In her first Playboy appearance, Waltz was billed as Margaret Scott. For years thereafter, many assumed that Marilyn and Margaret were two different women. It was not until the mid-1990s that they were determined to be one and the same.

May

Marguerite Empey (July 29, 1932 – August 19, 2008) was an American model, dancer and actress. She was Playboy magazine's Playmate of the Month in May 1955 and in February 1956.  The photos for her 1956 appearance were taken by soft core porn director Russ Meyer.

June

Eve Meyer (December 13, 1928 – March 27, 1977) was an American pin-up model, motion picture actress, and later, film producer. Much of her work was done in conjunction with sexploitation filmmaker Russ Meyer to whom she was married from April 2, 1952, until 1969. Eve perished in the Tenerife airport disaster on board Pan Am Flight 1736.

July

Janet Pilgrim (June 13, 1934 – May 1, 2017) was an American model and office worker for Playboy. She was chosen as Playboy's Playmate of the Month three times: July 1955,  December 1955 and  October 1956.

August

Pat Lawler (born December 29, 1929) is an American model. She was Playboy magazine's Playmate of the Month for the August 1955 issue. Her centerfold was photographed by Hal Adams.

September

Anne Fleming (born December 1, 1929) is an American actress and model. She was Playboy magazine's Playmate of the Month for the September 1955 issue. Her centerfold was photographed by Hal Adams.

October

Jean Moorhead (born February 4, 1935) is an American actress and model. Using the slightly differently spelled name Jean Moorehead, she was Playboy magazine's Playmate of the Month for the October 1955 issue. Her centerfold was photographed by Hal Adams. A former Miss Hollywood, Moorhead acted in television and in movies such as the Ed Wood-scripted The Violent Years (1956).

November

Barbara Cameron is an American model. She was Playboy magazine's Playmate of the Month for its November 1955 issue. Her centerfold was photographed by Lawrence Tirschel.

December

See July entry above

See also
 List of people in Playboy 1953–59

References

1955-related lists
Playmates Of 1955